Center Township, Arkansas may refer to:

 Center Township, Montgomery County, Arkansas
 Center Township, Polk County, Arkansas
 Center Township, Pope County, Arkansas
 Center Township, Prairie County, Arkansas
 Center Township, Sebastian County, Arkansas
 Center Township, Washington County, Arkansas

See also 
 List of townships in Arkansas
 Center Township (disambiguation)

Arkansas township disambiguation pages